IGE (Internet Gaming Entertainment) is a company that trades in virtual currency and accounts for MMORPGs. The company sold virtual goods for real money in more than a dozen popular games. Members of the gaming community were often critical of IGE, as its services were against the rules of the games.

During its peak, it had offices in Los Angeles, Shanghai as well as headquarters and a customer service center in Hong Kong. It was reformed in 2007 by Jonathan Yantis.

History 

IGE was founded in 2001 by Brock Pierce, a former child actor, and Alan Debonneville. They met while playing Everquest and decided to form IGE. Pierce was the main investor in the company, while Debonneville was managing the operations. Brock Pierce was also the co-founder of the controversially failed dot-com Digital Entertainment Network (DEN). Media reports claim that Marc Collins-Rector is a silent partner in IGE. IGE initially used an address in the city of Marbella, Spain, where Collins-Rector and Pierce shared a villa until it was raided by Interpol in 2002.

In January 2004, IGE acquired its major competitor, Yantis Enterprises, then run by another secondary market figure, Jonathan Yantis, for $2.4 million and 37% share of the company. Yantis later sold his shares back to IGE in exchange for 22 monthly payments of $1 million due to conflicts and disagreement.

IGE's parent company, RPG Holdings, purchased Allakhazam in November 2005, as announced in May 2006. This purchase followed the acquisition of Thottbot.

In late 2006 and 2007, Debonneville was forced out of the company. Later, Debonneville sued Pierce for various reasons related to an investment made by Goldman Sachs a year earlier, which Debonneville won.

IGE tried to restructure its upper management team by recruiting new executives. The company began to lose revenue due to the frequent deletion of accounts involved in trading. In May 2007, a lawsuit was filed against IGE by Antonio Hernandez for "substantially impairing and diminishing [player's] collective enjoyment of the game." In June 2007, Pierce was replaced as CEO by Steve Bannon, who had been placed on the board following the Goldman Sachs investment.

During the final months of IGE leading to its reformation, the board of directors decided to sell the company to their former partner Jonathan Yantis. IGE's parent company was then renamed Atlas Technology Group Inc, which is owned by Yantis, while Brock went with Affinity Media.

Affinity Media was said to be one of the parent companies of IGE, though the company no longer has any ownership stake. Affinity Media's senior vice president of business development, John Maffei, noted that "we’re no longer in that business" Affinity retains control of Allakhazam.com, Thottbot.com and has since purchased Wowhead.com.

In April 2014, IGE announced a formal service agreement with virtual currency provider EpicToon.com, who confirmed they will be handling IGE's virtual currency line of business.

Revenue 
Like other in-game currency traders, the vast majority of IGE's revenue comes from trading World of Warcraft gold. Its website traffic, and allegedly its revenues, have been declining since 2006 due to the increased competition from the in-game currency traders based in China and anti-real-money trading measures by Blizzard Entertainment, the publisher of World of Warcraft.

Reception 
Some gamers liked IGE's offers of World of Warcraft money that would normally take hours to farm. Other gamers called it cheating. Many gamers responded by posting anti-Chinese vitriol, since people earning the gold were "low-wage Chinese workers". Blizzard Entertainment, the owners of the video game, eventually shut down accounts used by "gold farmers". IGE was also the target of a class action lawsuit by a player who said that IGE's practices were "substantially impairing" people's enjoyment of the game.

Games

Current

 WildStar
 Elder Scrolls Online
 FIFA 14
 DC Universe Online
 Diablo 3
 Final Fantasy XIV
 Guild Wars 2
 Rift
 RuneScape
 Star Wars: The Old Republic
 TERA
 The Secret World
 World of Warcraft

Former
 Age of Conan
 Aion Online
 EverQuest II
 Final Fantasy XI
 Lineage 2
 Vanguard: Saga of Heroes

See also 
 Virtual goods
 Virtual world

References

External links 
 

Online marketplaces of the United States
Organizations established in 2001
Video game websites